Tropaeolum majus, the garden nasturtium, nasturtium, Indian cress or monks cress, is a species of flowering plant in the family Tropaeolaceae, originating in the Andes from Bolivia north to Colombia. An easily-grown annual or short-lived perennial with disc-shaped leaves and brilliant yellow, orange or red flowers, it is of cultivated, probably hybrid origin. It is not closely related to the genus Nasturtium (which includes watercress).

Etymology
The species was originally called Nasturtium indicum ("Indian nasturtium") but the plant is not related to the true Nasturtium genus.

The current genus name Tropaeolum, coined by Linnaeus, means "little trophy". Tropaeolum is the diminutive form of the Latin tropaeum,  itself borrowed from Ancient Greek τρόπαιον : trópaion "trophy".

The Latin specific epithet majus means “larger” (the neuter form of major).

Description
The leaves are large, nearly circular,  in diameter, green to glaucous green above, paler below; they are peltate, with the 5–30 cm long petiole near the middle of the leaf, with several veins radiating to the smoothly rounded or slightly lobed margin.

Lotus effect
Nasturtium leaves, like some other species, demonstrate the lotus effect, whereby rainwater falling on the surface gathers into globular droplets which roll off the leaf, leaving it dry and clean.

Flowers and fruit

The flowers are 2.5–6 cm in diameter, mildly scented, with five petals, eight stamens, and a 2.5–3 cm long nectar spur at the rear; they vary from yellow to orange to red, frilled and often darker at the base of the petals. The fruit is 2 cm broad, three-segmented, each segment with a single large seed 1–1.5 cm long.

The Elizabeth Linnaeus phenomenon
Das Elisabeth Linné-Phänomen, or the Elizabeth Linnæus Phenomenon, is the name given to the phenomenon of "flashing flowers". Especially at dusk, the orange flowers may appear to emit small "flashes". Once believed to be an electrical phenomenon, it is today thought to be an optical reaction in the human eye caused by the contrast between the orange flowers and the surrounding green. The phenomenon is named after Elisabeth Christina von Linné, one of Carl Linnaeus's daughters, who discovered it at age 19.

Ecology
The garden nasturtium is used as a food plant by the larvae of some Lepidoptera species including the dot moth and the garden carpet moth. A common pest found on nasturtiums is the caterpillar of the large white or cabbage white butterfly.

Introduced range
The species has become naturalized in parts of the United States (California, New York, Pennsylvania, New Hampshire, Massachusetts, Connecticut and Virginia), as well as parts of Europe and Asia, Africa and Australia. It is listed as invasive in Hawaii and Lord Howe Island, Australia.

Cultivation and uses

Tropaeolum majus cultivars are widely grown as easy annual plants, for poor, damp soil in full sun. The large seeds are easy to handle individually.

As they do not tolerate heavy frost they are best sown under glass in heat, and planted out after all danger of frost has passed. Alternatively, as they are fast-growing, they may be sown in situ in May or June.

Many flower colours are available, in the warm spectrum from cream through yellow, orange, red and maroon. Some have highly decorative marbling on the leaves.

The groups Whirlybird Series and Alaska Series have gained the Royal Horticultural Society’s Award of Garden Merit.

Culinary

All of the above-ground parts of the plants are edible. The flower has most often been consumed, making for an especially ornamental salad ingredient; it has a slightly peppery taste reminiscent of watercress, and is also used in stir fry. The flowers contain about 130 mg vitamin C per , about the same amount as is contained in parsley. Moreover, they contain up to 45 mg of lutein per 100 g, which is the highest amount found in any edible plant. The unripe seed pods can be harvested and dropped into spiced vinegar to produce a condiment and garnish, sometimes used in place of capers.

Traditional medicine
Some native South Americans used the plant medicinally, apparently due to its antibiotic and antibacterial properties. Some Europeans ate it to treat urinary and genital infections.

Gallery

References

majus
Flora of South America
Garden plants
Plants described in 1753
Taxa named by Carl Linnaeus
Leaf vegetables